The 1997 Pan American Women's Handball Championship was the fourth edition of the Pan American Women's Handball Championship, held in Brazil from 29 April to 4 May 1997. It acted as the American qualifying tournament for the 1997 World Women's Handball Championship.

Preliminary round

Knockout stage

Third place game

Final

Final ranking

External links
Results on todor66.com

1997 Women
American Women's Handball Championship
Pan
1997 in Brazilian women's sport
April 1997 sports events in South America
May 1997 sports events in South America